Mexico competed at the 2004 Summer Olympics in Athens, Greece, from 13 to 29 August 2004. This was the nation's twentieth appearance at the Olympics, since its debut in 1900. Comité Olímpico Mexicano sent the nation's largest delegation to the Games since 1992. A total of 109 athletes, 59 men and 50 women, competed in 20 sports. Football was the only team-based sport in which Mexico had its representation in these Olympic Games. There was only a single competitor in fencing, shooting, and weightlifting.

The Mexican team featured three Olympic medalists from Sydney: race walker Noé Hernández, taekwondo jin Víctor Estrada, and diver Fernando Platas, who reprised his role to carry the national flag for the second time in the opening ceremony, after winning the silver in men's springboard. Along with Platas, race walkers Miguel Ángel Rodríguez and Germán Sánchez officially made their fourth Olympic appearance as the most experienced members of the team. Meanwhile, show jumper Gerardo Tazzer, who helped the Mexicans claim the bronze at the 1980 Summer Olympics in Moscow, sought his fourth Olympic bid in Athens after a sixteen-year absence, and was also the oldest athlete of the team at age 52.

Mexico left Athens with a total of four medals (three silver and one bronze), failing to win a gold for the first time since 1996. Half of these medals were awarded to the athletes in taekwondo. Sprinter Ana Guevara set the nation's historical milestone as the first ever female Mexican to claim an Olympic silver medal in track and field. Meanwhile, Belem Guerrero claimed a silver for the first time in the nation's Olympic cycling history, since the 1984 Summer Olympics in Los Angeles, since José Youshimatz took home the bronze in the men's points race.

Medalists

Archery

Three Mexican archers qualified each for the men's individual archery, and a spot for the men's team.

Athletics

Mexican athletes have so far achieved qualifying standards in the following athletics events (up to a maximum of 3 athletes in each event at the 'A' Standard, and 1 at the 'B' Standard).

Men
Track & road events

Field events

Women
Track & road events

Field events

Boxing

Mexico sent five boxers to Athens.

Cycling

Road

Track
Time trial

Omnium

Diving

Mexican divers qualified for eight individual spots at the 2004 Olympic Games. Two Mexican synchronized diving teams qualified through the 2004 FINA Diving World Cup.

Men

Women

Equestrian

Show jumping

Fencing

Men

Football

Men's tournament

Roster

Group play

Women's tournament

Roster

Group play

Quarterfinals

Gymnastics

Artistic
Women

Judo

Three Mexican judoka (two men and one woman) qualified for the 2004 Summer Olympics.

Modern pentathlon

Two Mexican athletes qualified to compete in the modern pentathlon event through the 2003 Pan American Games in Santo Domingo, Dominican Republic.

Rowing

Mexican rowers qualified the following boats:

Women

Qualification Legend: FA=Final A (medal); FB=Final B (non-medal); FC=Final C (non-medal); FD=Final D (non-medal); FE=Final E (non-medal); FF=Final F (non-medal); SA/B=Semifinals A/B; SC/D=Semifinals C/D; SE/F=Semifinals E/F; QF=Quarterfinals; R=Repechage

Sailing

Mexican sailors have qualified one boat for each of the following events.

Men

Women

M = Medal race; OCS = On course side of the starting line; DSQ = Disqualified; DNF = Did not finish; DNS= Did not start; RDG = Redress given

Shooting 

One Mexican shooter qualified to compete in the following events:

Men

Swimming

Mexican swimmers earned qualifying standards in the following events (up to a maximum of 2 swimmers in each event at the A-standard time, and 1 at the B-standard time):

Men

Women

Synchronized swimming 

Two Mexican synchronized swimmers qualified a spot in the women's duet.

Taekwondo

Three Mexican taekwondo jin qualified for the following events.

Triathlon

Two Mexican triathletes qualified for the following events.

Volleyball

Beach

Weightlifting 

Mexico has qualified a single weightlifter.

See also
 Mexico at the 2003 Pan American Games
 Mexico at the 2004 Summer Paralympics

References

External links
Official Report of the XXVIII Olympiad
Mexican Olympic Committee 
Mexicanos en Atenas 

Nations at the 2004 Summer Olympics
2004
Olympics